Anita Shrestha is a Nepalese sports shooter. She competed in the women's 10 metre air rifle event at the 1992 Summer Olympics.

References

Year of birth missing (living people)
Living people
Nepalese female sport shooters
Olympic shooters of Nepal
Shooters at the 1992 Summer Olympics
Place of birth missing (living people)